Xi Piscium (ξ Piscium) is an orange-hued binary star system in the zodiac constellation of Pisces. In 1690, the astronomer Johannes Hevelius in his Firmamentum Sobiescianum regarded the constellation Pisces as being composed of four subdivisions. Xi Piscium was considered to be part of the Linum Austrinum, the South Cord. The star is visible to the naked eye, having an apparent visual magnitude of 4.60. Based upon an annual parallax shift of 11.67 mas as seen from Earth, it is located about 280 light years from the Sun. It is moving away from the Sun, having a radial velocity of +26 km/s.

This is a single-lined spectroscopic binary system with an orbital period of 4.6 years and an eccentricity of around 0.18. The spectroscopic binary nature of this star was discovered in 1901 by William Wallace Campbell using the Mills spectrograph at the Lick Observatory. The visible component is an evolved K-type giant star with a stellar classification of K0 III. It is a red clump star, which indicates it is generating energy through helium fusion at its core.

In non-Western astronomy
In Chinese astronomy, the "Outer Fence" refers to an asterism consisting of ξ Piscium, δ Piscium, ε Piscium, ζ Piscium, μ Piscium, ν Piscium and α Piscium. Consequently, the Chinese name for ξ Piscium itself is "the Sixth Star of the Outer Fence"

References

K-type giants
Horizontal-branch stars
Spectroscopic binaries
Pisces (constellation)
Piscium, Xi
Durchmusterung objects
Piscium, 111
011559
008833
0549